RTV IS or RTV Istočno Sarajevo is a local Bosnian public cable television channel based in Istočno Sarajevo, Bosnia and Herzegovina. The program is mainly produced in Serbian. TV station was established in 2008. Local radio station Radio Istočno Sarajevo is also part of this company. The channel broadcasts local news, TV series and entertainment. Channel is also part of local news network in the RS entity called PRIMA mreža.

References

External links 
 
 Communications Regulatory Agency of Bosnia and Herzegovina

Mass media in Istočno Sarajevo
Television stations in Bosnia and Herzegovina
Television channels and stations established in 2008